Cubeez is a British computer-animated preschool education television series that was broadcast between 2000 and 2001 on GMTV's Kids. It is aimed at pre-school children aged 2–5. The four box-like characters, Bozz, Doody, Dink and Tizzy are accompanied on their adventures by a talking paintbrush (voiced by Marc Silk) and a variety of creative characters that they're made in Alias Wavefront Maya. Each episode has a strong educational element and features live-action footage of children.

Characters

Cubeez 
 Bozz (voiced by Keith Wickham) – The pink male cubee, and the leader of the four.
 Tizzy (voiced by Jan Haydn Rowles) – The yellow female cubee.
 Dink (voiced by Mike Walling) – The blue male cubee.
 Doody (voiced by Tara Newley) – The orange female cubee with round red glasses.

Friends 
 Learning Wall (voiced by Marc Silk (season 1,) Claire King (Season 2)
 Boingles (voiced by Marc Silk)
 Wiggywams (voiced by Marc Silk)
 Eyesanozes (Marc Silk)
 Artist the Paintbrush (Marc Silk)
 Tock Tock (Marc Silk)
 Bobby Bingle Boingle
 Aunt Boingle
 Pecking Circle Pecker
 Peebo

Episodes
Music
Telling Stories
Busy Bears and Boingles
Growing
Transport and Speed
Weather
Colours and Patterns
Shapes
Counting
Fast and Slow
Up and Over
High and Low
Emotions
One to Five
Helping Hands
Caring for the Environment
Transport
Sight and Sound
Sports Day
Home Sweet Home
Hop, Skip and Jump
A Windy Day
Happy Birthday Dink
Colours/Patterns
Shapes
Fixing Things
Round and About
Lollipops and Flowers
Animals
Lost and Found
Pairs
Circles and Squares
Eyesanozes
Bobby Bingle Boingle
Music Box
Flowers
The Skeeta Race
Night And Day
Storytime
Over And Under
Spots And Stripes
Mending and Making
Shapes and Sizes
Party Time
Ice Cubeez
Over and Out
Slow or Fast
Everything Has a Pattern
Fun with Friends
Three, Two, One
Moves
Ups and Downs
Colours
Sounds Like
Changing Colours
Doc Bozz
Rise and Shine
See, Hear, Feel
Go Round
Five
Storytime
Seasons and Flowers
Fairplay
Loud and Quiet
Once Upon a Time
Surprise Surprise
Dance Dance Dance

VHS/DVDs
In the United Kingdom, Right Entertainment and Universal Pictures Video released the series on VHS and DVD, using the half-hour version of the programme and containing three episodes each.

The first VHS volume, titled "Colours and Shapes", was released on 27 May 2002, contains the episodes "Colours and Patterns", "Shapes" and "Counting". The second VHS volume - "Musical Storytime", was released on 14 August 2002, contains the episodes "Music", "Telling Stories" and "Busy Bears and Boingles". They were released on DVD on 10 May and 16 August 2004, respectively.

The third VHS/DVD volume, titled Up & Over, was released on 7 February 2005, contains the episodes "Fast and Slow", "Up and Over" and "High and Low". The final volume, released only on DVD, titled "Growing", was released on 2 May 2005 and contains the episodes "Growing", "Transport and Speed" and "Weather".

Broadcast 
Cubeez has been shown around the world. In the United Kingdom, it was aired on Nick Jr. from October 2001 to October 2003, and then on Channel 4 from around 2005 to early 2009. In Australia, it aired on ABC Kids. In New Zealand it aired on TV3.

References

2000 British television series debuts
2001 British television series endings
1990s British animated television series
British children's animated adventure television series
1990s British children's television series
Channel 4 original programming
British computer-animated television series
ITV children's television shows
Nick Jr. original programming
British preschool education television series
English-language television shows
2000s British animated television series
2000s British children's television series
Animated preschool education television series
2000s preschool education television series